Rudolph Brasch AM OBE (6 November 191213 November 2004) was an Australian rabbi and author.

Biography
He was born in Berlin, Germany and moved to London when Hitler gained power in 1933.  He eventually emigrated to Australia, arriving in 1949, and was the Chief Minister of the Temple Emanuel in Sydney for the next thirty years.

Among his honours were the Coronation Medal (1952), Officer of the Order of the British Empire (1967), the Silver Jubilee Medal (1977) and Member of the Order of Australia (1979).

He wrote several books, mostly focusing on customs and their origin.

He died on 13 November 2004, aged 92.

Bibliography

References

1912 births
2004 deaths
Australian non-fiction writers
Australian Officers of the Order of the British Empire
Members of the Order of Australia
Australian rabbis
Jewish emigrants from Nazi Germany to Australia
Jewish Australian writers
Rabbis from Berlin
Jewish emigrants from Nazi Germany to the United Kingdom